Issam Jebali (born 25 December 1991) is a Tunisian professional footballer who plays as a forward or a winger for J1 League club Gamba Osaka and the Tunisia national team.

Club career
Jebali signed with Värnamo in 2015 before signing with Elfsborg in July 2016. In August 2018 he signed for Rosenborg. In January 2019 he signed for Al-Wehda. Al-Wehda and Jebali received criticism from Rosenborg as a response to Al-Wehda appearing to announce the signing of Jebali before a deal with Rosenborg was actually finalised.

On 30 July 2019, it was confirmed that Jebali had joined Danish Superliga club Odense Boldklub on a three-year contract. In September 2020, he scored four goals in three matches, and his performances led to him being named as the Danish Superliga Player of the Month.

On 5 January 2023, Jebali officially joined Japanese side Gamba Osaka for an estimated transfer fee of 7.5 milion Danish krones (around one million euros), signing a three-year contract with the club.

Career statistics

Club

International goals

Honours
Tunisia
Kirin Cup: 2022
Individual
Superliga Player of the Month: September 2020

References

1991 births
Living people
Tunisian footballers
Tunisian expatriate footballers
Association football forwards
Tunisia international footballers
People from Béja Governorate
2021 Africa Cup of Nations players
2022 FIFA World Cup players
Algerian Ligue Professionnelle 1 players
Superettan players
Allsvenskan players
Saudi Professional League players
Eliteserien players
Danish Superliga players
Étoile Sportive du Sahel players
ES Zarzis players
IFK Värnamo players
IF Elfsborg players
Rosenborg BK players
Al-Wehda Club (Mecca) players
Odense Boldklub players
Gamba Osaka players
Tunisian expatriate sportspeople in Norway
Tunisian expatriate sportspeople in Saudi Arabia
Expatriate footballers in Sweden
Expatriate footballers in Norway
Expatriate men's footballers in Denmark
Expatriate footballers in Saudi Arabia
Expatriate footballers in Japan